Andy Thompson (21 January 1899 – 1 January 1970) was a professional footballer who played for Tottenham Hotspur, Chester, Norwich City, Clapton Orient, Ashford Town (Kent) and Northfleet.

Football career 
Thompson began his playing career in the North East with non–league Whickham Park Villa and later Newburn before joining Tottenham. He made his debut for the Lilywhites versus Sunderland on 26 March 1921 in the position of centre half. Thompson converted to the forward line where he scored 22 goals in 166 appearances in all competitions. He joined Chester in July, 1931 where he played a further seven games and finding the net twice before moving to Norwich City. He featured in a further 12 matches and scored on two occasions for the East Anglian club. In 1932 he joined Clapton Orient where he went on to make a further 18 appearances and netting five times. Ashford Town was his next club before becoming player coach at Northfleet. He returned to the Spurs in 1938 where he held the position of assistant coach. On leaving the White Hart Lane club he became a member of the Chelsea training staff. He once again returned to the Spurs in the 1950s to be in charge of the youth team until 1960 and held a number of backroom roles till his retirement in August, 1969.

Thompson died at home on 1 January 1970 in Leyton.

References

1899 births
1970 deaths
Footballers from Newcastle upon Tyne
English footballers
English Football League players
Tottenham Hotspur F.C. players
Chester City F.C. players
Norwich City F.C. players
Leyton Orient F.C. players
Ashford United F.C. players
Northfleet United F.C. players
Association football outside forwards